Nery Minchez (born 1 June 1963) is a Guatemalan weightlifter. He competed in the men's bantamweight event at the 1984 Summer Olympics.

References

1963 births
Living people
Guatemalan male weightlifters
Olympic weightlifters of Guatemala
Weightlifters at the 1984 Summer Olympics
Place of birth missing (living people)